Leslie Newman (1938 – c. 2021) was a screenwriter who co-wrote the first three Superman films with husband David Newman, who died in 2003. She was born in 1939, in the United States. They had two children together.  She has written a novel entitled Gathering Force (Simon & Schuster, 1974), and a cookbook entitled Feasts: Menus for Home-cooked Celebrations (HarperCollins, 1990).

Newman studied at the University of Michigan.

Filmography 
Superman (1978)...co-screenplay
Superman II (1980)...co-screenplay
Superman III (1983)...co-screenplay
Santa Claus: The Movie (1985)...co-story
Takedown (2000)...co-screenplay

References

External links
 With the Walkout Over, Writers David and Leslie Newman Strike Up 'Superman III'. People, July 27, 1981. Accessed 2011-03-02.
 Craig Claiborne with Pierre Franey, “Home Cooking for 200 Guests”. New York Times Sunday Magazine, October 24, 1982. Accessed 2012-12-26.

External links

1938 births
21st-century American women
American screenwriters
American women screenwriters
Place of birth missing (living people)
University of Michigan alumni
Hugo Award-winning writers